Gać is a village in the administrative district of Gmina Łomża, within Łomża County, Podlaskie Voivodeship, in north-eastern Poland.

In 2002 the village had a population of 986.

References

Villages in Łomża County